Himantoglossum is a genus of orchids native to the Canary Islands, Europe, southwest Asia and northern Africa. Its members generally have a labellum which is divided into three parts, of which the middle part is the longest.

The genera Comperia and Barlia are now included in Himantoglossum.

Species
, the World Checklist of Selected Plant Families recognizes the following species:

Himantoglossum adriaticum H.Baumann  - Italy, Austria, Czech Republic 
Himantoglossum calcaratum (Beck) Schltr. - Greece, Bulgaria, European Turkey, former Yugoslavia 
Himantoglossum caprinum (M.Bieb.) Spreng.
Himantoglossum caprinum subsp. caprinum - Crimea, Iran, Iraq, Turkey, Palestine, Israel 
Himantoglossum comperianum (Steven) P.Delforge (syn. Comperia comperianum) - Crimea, Greek Islands, Turkey, Iran, Iraq, Syria, Lebanon, Palestine, Israel 
Himantoglossum formosum (Steven) K.Koch - Caucasus, Iran
Himantoglossum galilaeum Shifman - Israel
Himantoglossum hircinum (L.) Spreng. - Britain, Belgium, the Netherlands, France, Germany, Spain, Portugal and Morocco
Himantoglossum jankae Somlyay, Kreutz & Óvári -Balkans, Greek islands, Turkey, Hungary, Slovakia
Himantoglossum jankae subsp. rumelicum (H.Baumann & R.Lorenz) J.Ponert - Czech Republic, former Yugoslavia, Greece and Turkey
Himantoglossum metlesicsianum (W.P.Teschner) P.Delforge - Canary Islands
Himantoglossum montis-tauri Kreutz & W.Lüders - Turkey, Greek Islands?
Himantoglossum robertianum (Loisel.) P.Delforge (syn. Barlia robertianum) - Mediterranean from Portugal and Morocco east to Turkey
Himantoglossum × samariense C.Alibertis & A.Alibertis - Crete

References

External links 

 
Orchideae genera
Orchids of Europe
Flora of North Africa
Flora of the Canary Islands
Flora of Turkey
Flora of Iran
Flora of Iraq
Flora of Israel
Flora of Palestine (region)